Shadow of the Devil is a 1996 Slovakia Point-and-click adventure released on the Amiga.

The game was originally announced as "Dark Seed Killer" in 1994, to be developed by an unknown Slovakian team and published by Slovak publisher Riki who owned the video game reviewing magazine of the same name. Screenshots and demos were created by Marek Forray. The game was released as Shadow of the Devils in late 1996 " after many struggles". According to a 2016 retrospective by Riki, "there was some personal conflict between the authors and the publisher that lead to this disappointing release". The game's skoopy house set pieces were designed by Michal Blazicek, while Marek Forray created the second half hell-like environments. The game features one tune repeated.

Plot and gameplay 
It is the last day of 1999, and the player visits their aunts house. In a diary the player reads that the devil will take over the world the following day. The player must save the world from within the house.

The game lacks a save feature, despite it being very easy to die. The game's language is only in Slovakian.

Critical reception
Riki wrote that upon release, the game was "unfinished, unpolished, and very basic".  Riki wrote in a 2016 retrospective, "it is hard to believe that someone actually really released this game for Amiga in this state and honestly believed it would be a success in 1996". Amiga Review felt it was a game with interesting ideas that weren't properly executed.

References

External links
 Riki preview
 Riki preview 2
 Level review
Riki article

1996 video games
Adventure games
Amiga games
Amiga-only games
Fiction about the Devil
Riki Computer Games games
Single-player video games
Video games about demons
Video games developed in Slovakia
Video games set in 1999